The multiverse is a fictional setting in the Marvel Cinematic Universe (MCU) media franchise. Based on the setting of the same name from the Marvel Comics, it is a collection of infinitely many alternate realities and dimensions. First explored in the film Doctor Strange (2016), it is revisited in the film Avengers: Endgame (2019) before playing a key role in Phase Four, Phase Five, and Phase Six of the franchise, which comprise "The Multiverse Saga".

Many alternate versions of existing MCU characters have been introduced via the multiverse, most notably those of Loki, Peter Parker / Spider-Man, Dr. Stephen Strange, and Kang. The main reality depicted in the MCU is designated Earth-616 in the film Doctor Strange in the Multiverse of Madness (2022), despite previously being designated Earth-199999 by Marvel Comics. The multiverse has received a mixed response from critics, with praise for its visuals and nostalgic appeal but criticism of its excessive reliance on fan service. The incorporation of characters from non-MCU Marvel films has also generated speculation and discussion among viewers and commentators.

Concept and creation 
The multiverse was first introduced to the Marvel Comics during the 1960s and 70s. In Strange Tales #103 (1962), the character Johnny Storm of the Fantastic Four is teleported to an alternate reality for the first time in Marvel history, with the character sent to the Fifth Dimension. The concept of the multiverse was then fully explored in What If...? #1 (1977) and Marvel Two-in-One #50 (1979), with the term "multiverse" first used in the What If...? series. The main reality featured in the comics, Earth-616, was first named in The Daredevils #7 (1983) by Captain Britain creator David Thorpe in order to differentiate the character from his alternate versions.

In 2008, the film Iron Man was released, kickstarting the Marvel Cinematic Universe (MCU) media franchise. The setting of the franchise was subsequently designated Earth-199999 by Marvel Comics in the hardcover version of the Official Handbook of the Marvel Universe A-Z, Vol. 5 (2008). The characters Loki, Gwenpool, and Doctor Strange from the comics have been shown to be aware of the MCU's existence. The multiverse is introduced to the MCU in the film Doctor Strange (2016), with director Scott Derrickson noting that the character in the comics had previously "broke[n] open the Marvel comic book universe into the Marvel multiverse". At the time, producer and Marvel Studios president Kevin Feige stated that there were no plans to explore parallel universes similar to the ones featured in the comics, with the film instead exploring various "alien dimensions".

The MCU multiverse is revisited in the film Avengers: Endgame (2019), in which the Avengers journey to four alternate timelines as part of a "Time Heist". The escape of an alternate version of Loki from an alternate 2012 New York sets up the first season of the Disney+ series Loki (2021). The multiverse plays a central role in Phase Four of the MCU, most notably in the first season of Loki, the first and second seasons of the Disney+ series What If...? (2021 and 2023), the film Spider-Man: No Way Home (2021), and the film Doctor Strange in the Multiverse of Madness (2022). Phase Four, Phase Five, and Phase Six of the MCU will comprise "The Multiverse Saga".

The showrunners of Loki collaborated with the crews behind the Disney+ series WandaVision (2021), What If...?, and the film Ant-Man and the Wasp: Quantumania (2023), as all three projects are connected to the multiverse in some way. Together with WandaVision co-executive producer Mary Livanos and What If...? executive producer Brad Winderbaum, Loki executive producers Kevin Wright and Stephen Broussard developed a "rule book" regarding the MCU's multiverse and alternate timelines. Feige also held a meeting with Marvel Studios executives to discuss the rules of the multiverse and how they would present it to audiences.

Depictions

Doctor Strange (2016) 
In Doctor Strange, the term "multiverse" is used by the Masters of the Mystic Arts to describe the multitude of dimensions within the MCU. The character Ancient One brings Dr. Stephen Strange on a journey across the multiverse, passing by different universes and pocket realities, including the Quantum Realm introduced in the film Ant-Man (2015), the Mandelibus Dimension, the Actiniaria Dimension, the Flowering Incense Dimension, and the Grass Jelly Dimension. Internally referred to as the "Magical Mystery Tour" at Marvel Studios, the scene was originally seven minutes long. In an unrealized scene in the film Avengers: Infinity War (2018), Strange sends Thanos through a series of alternate universes, emulating the Magical Mystery Tour. The film most notably explores the Astral Dimension, the Dark Dimension, and the Mirror Dimension.

Astrophysicist Adam Frank was consulted on the depiction of the multiverse in Doctor Strange, offering guidance on how to portray the dimensions in a scientific manner. Frank stated that he did not believe the multiverse exists in real life, but viewed it as a "great idea to use for fiction". He added that the film's depiction did not need to be scientifically accurate as long as it "[drew] from the way scientists think about reality and think about space and dimensions".

Avengers: Endgame (2019) 
In Endgame, the Avengers travel through the Quantum Realm in three groups to 1970 Camp Lehigh, 2012 New York, 2013 Asgard, as well as 2014 Morag and Vormir, in order to retrieve the six Infinity Stones displaced through time. The events of The Avengers (2012), Thor: The Dark World (2013), and Guardians of the Galaxy (2014) are revisited in the film. The film establishes the rules of time travel in the MCU, rejecting the grandfather paradox and the butterfly effect which state that changes to the past will affect the future in the same timeline. Instead, the film stipulates that when the past or future is changed, it diverges from the main timeline into an alternate one, effectively creating a parallel universe.

When Tony Stark / Iron Man and Scott Lang / Ant-Man attempt to acquire the Tesseract from 2012 New York, an alternate version of Loki escapes with the Tesseract. Alternate versions of Thanos, Gamora, and Nebula teleport from 2014 to the Avengers Compound in the present-day, leading to the Battle of Earth. Afterward, Steve Rogers / Captain America returns the Infinity Stones and Mjölnir to their original timelines, choosing to stay behind with an alternate version of Peggy Carter in 1949 and grow old with her. The directors and screenwriter of the film disagree on whether this was done in an alternate reality through time travel, or in the past in the main timeline.

Agents of S.H.I.E.L.D. season 6 (2019) 
The bulk of the sixth season of the ABC series Agents of S.H.I.E.L.D. (2019) is set in an alternate timeline, in part due to the showrunners' uncertainty on whether the season would air before or after Endgame.

Spider-Man: Far From Home (2019) 
In the film Spider-Man: Far From Home (2019), Quentin Beck / Mysterio claims to Peter Parker / Spider-Man that he and the Elementals are from an alternate reality in the multiverse named Earth-833, calling the main universe depicted in the MCU Earth-616. This is later revealed to be a ruse devised by Beck and his crew in order to gain revenge on Stark, their former employer. Additionally, J. K. Simmons appears in a mid-credits scene as J. Jonah Jameson after previously portraying the character in Sam Raimi's Spider-Man trilogy, but director Jon Watts clarified that the character was a new incarnation and not "from another dimension or multiverse". Despite this, Feige confirmed that a multiverse indeed existed in the MCU.

Agents of S.H.I.E.L.D. season 7 (2020) 
The seventh season of Agents of S.H.I.E.L.D. (2020) follows a team of S.H.I.E.L.D. agents as they pursue the Chronicoms across time through "tides". The season focuses on the consequences of time travel and the resultant branching timelines, which partially contradicts the rules established by Endgame. By the end of the season, a new timeline is created as a result of the S.H.I.E.L.D. team altering events in the past. The series finale, "What We're Fighting For", confirms that the events of the season had been taking place in a branched timeline, with Leo Fitz leading the team back to the MCU's main timeline through the Quantum Realm.

Loki season 1 (2021) 
The concept of the multiverse is explored in depth for the first time in the first season of Loki, which kicks off a multiverse-centric story arc in the MCU. The version of Loki who had escaped from 2012 New York during the events of Endgame is captured by the Time Variance Authority (TVA), an otherworldly organization which monitors the multiverse. The series designates the main reality depicted in the MCU as the Sacred Timeline, with the TVA striving to maintain this flow of time in all universes by "pruning" alternate timelines that have significantly deviated from the Sacred Timeline, using reset charges. Loki, who is labeled a "time variant" by the TVA, is recruited by Mobius M. Mobius to hunt down Sylvie, another alternate version of himself who has been ambushing TVA Minutemen in alternate timelines. After a skirmish at a 2050 Roxxon supermarket, the duo are forced to work together to escape 2077 Lamentis-1, a moon destined to be destroyed in an alternate timeline.

Additional variants of Loki are introduced in the Void, a barren dimension where individuals and objects are sent to after being pruned by the TVA. These include the elderly Classic Loki, the adolescent Kid Loki, the hammer-wielding Boastful Loki, and the repitilian Alligator Loki. In the season finale, "For All Time. Always.", Loki and Sylvie meet He Who Remains, a mysterious figure from the 31st century who ended a multiversal war between variants of himself before establishing the TVA. He is murdered by Sylvie, allowing universes to diverge from the Sacred Timeline and in turn leading to the unraveling of the multiverse. In the episode's final moments, Loki is transported to an alternate TVA, where he meets an oblivious Mobius and sees a statue of Kang the Conqueror, a malevolent variant of He Who Remains. This episode sets up the events of Multiverse of Madness, No Way Home, and Quantumania.

According to head writer Michael Waldron, the time travel rules established by Endgame are elaborated upon in the series, describing the multiverse as an overlapping cluster of intertwined timelines occurring at the same time. The Sacred Timeline is depicted as a circular shape when viewed from the Citadel at the End of Time, a concept conceived by the series' storyboard artists and thought by director Kate Herron to be a "striking image". Early concepts for the series included several other time periods which were ultimately not visited in the season. Feige has stated that the events of Loki would leave a significant lasting impact on the MCU, with Waldron adding that the series would have "wide-reaching ramifications" across the franchise.

What If...? season 1 (2021) 
The first season of What If...? explores numerous alternate realities that have deviated from the main timeline. The series is narrated by the Watcher, an almighty being who observes the multiverse without interfering. The alternate realities featured in the season include one where Carter becomes the super-soldier Captain Carter, one where T'Challa becomes Star-Lord, one where the Avengers are assassinated by Hank Pym / Yellowjacket during the events of the tie-in comic Fury's Big Week (2012), one where Stephen Strange is corrupted by dark magic, one where Janet van Dyne / Wasp triggers a zombie apocalypse, one where Erik "Killmonger" Stevens rescues Stark before causing a war between Wakanda and the U.S., one where Thor was an only child and lives a party lifestyle, and one where Ultron uses the Infinity Stones to exterminate all life in the universe.

The Watcher refuses to intervene when the corrupted Strange pleads with him to save his collapsing universe, citing his oath not to do so. After failing to defeat the Infinity Stones-wielding Ultron, the Watcher breaks his oath and recruits six multiversal heroes to the Guardians of the Multiverse in an effort to save the multiverse. Head writer A. C. Bradley was uncertain of how Loki and Multiverse of Madness would depict the multiverse, as production on What If..? began well before those two projects did, thus deciding to leave most of the MCU's multiversal "rules-building" to the crews behind Loki and Multiverse of Madness.

Spider-Man: No Way Home (2021) 
No Way Home connects the MCU to Sony Pictures' other Spider-Man films, with multiple characters from alternate realities accidentally transported to the main timeline due to a miscast spell performed by Strange intended to erase the world's knowledge of Parker's identity as Spider-Man. Tobey Maguire, Alfred Molina, Willem Dafoe, and Thomas Haden Church reprise their roles as Peter Parker / Spider-Man, Otto Octavius / Doctor Octopus, Norman Osborn / Green Goblin, and Flint Marko / Sandman, respectively, from Raimi's Spider-Man trilogy; Andrew Garfield, Jamie Foxx, and Rhys Ifans reprise their roles as Peter Parker / Spider-Man, Max Dillon / Electro, and Curt Connors / Lizard, respectively, from Marc Webb's The Amazing Spider-Man films; while Tom Hardy reprises his roles as Eddie Brock and Venom from Sony's Spider-Man Universe (SSU). Many of these actors arrived on sets wearing cloaks in order to avoid leaks of their involvement.

In the film, Parker refuses to send Octavius, Osborn, Marko, Dillon, and Connors to their deadly fates in their original realities, trapping Strange in the Mirror Dimension. After all but Octavius go rogue, Parker is joined by his alternate counterparts, dubbed "Peter-Two" (Maguire) and "Peter-Three" (Garfield), in developing cures for the multiversal villains. During a battle in front of the Statue of Liberty, the destruction of Strange's Macchina di Kadavus begins to tear the fabric of reality, forcing Strange to erase the world's memories of Parker before sending the multiversal characters back to their own universes. Screenwriters Chris McKenna and Erik Sommers began exploring the idea of the multiverse and potentially revisiting characters from past Spider-Man films early on during the writing process, initially planning for this to be a minor tease for fans. Early drafts had featured virtually every major character from previous Spider-Man films, but this was eventually narrowed down to avoid excessive fan service. Almost all of the multiversal villains were redesigned at some level for the film: Osborn and Dillon were given more comics-accurate appearances, while Molina and Dafoe were both digitally de-aged.

Doctor Strange in the Multiverse of Madness (2022) 
The plot of Multiverse of Madness revolves entirely around the multiverse. The film introduces the character America Chavez, a teenager from the Utopian Parallel who can teleport between universes through star-shaped portals. In the opening of the film, Chavez and an alternate version of Strange from Earth-617 battle a demon in the Gap Junction, a space between universes, before Chavez escapes to the main MCU reality. The attire worn by this version of Strange was modeled after Matt Fraction's Defenders (2011) comic book series. Chavez and Strange are later seen crashing through 20 different universes, which include a world inhabited by statues resembling the Marvel Comics character Living Tribunal, an animated world with a comic-book style appearance, a destroyed New York City in the aftermath of an alternate Battle of New York, a world composed of Stark Industries combat drones from Far From Home, the dinosaur-inhabited Savage Land from the comics, and a black-and-white New York City stuck in the 1930s after being taken over by Hydra. Visual effects for the 40-second-long sequence were provided by Framestore, which initiated development nearly a year-and-a-half before the film's release. The company refers to the sequence as the "America Portal Ride", with head animator Alexis Wajsbrot seeking to "echo the craziness" of Doctor Strange Magical Mystery Tour. Other references in the sequence include homages to the work of M. C. Escher, Salvador Dalí, and Pablo Picasso.

The duo is subsequently captured by the Illuminati, a secret society of superhumans, in Earth-838. The group includes Karl Mordo, Captain Carter, Blackagar Boltagon / Black Bolt, Maria Rambeau / Captain Marvel, Reed Richards, and Professor Charles Xavier, who are portrayed by Chiwetel Ejiofor, Hayley Atwell, Anson Mount, Lashana Lynch, John Krasinski, and Patrick Stewart, respectively. Ejiofor, Atwell, Lynch, and Mount all reprise their roles from prior MCU media, while Stewart reprises his role from 20th Century Fox's X-Men film series. However, they all play alternate versions of their characters separate from their original roles. Mount dons a more comics-accurate costume than his appearance in the ABC series Inhumans (2017), while Lynch was surprised when she learned she would be playing an alternate version of Rambeau, initially believing she would be portraying an ancestor of Rambeau. Feige cast Krasinski in the role because he was a highly popular suggestion for the role from fans, with his appearance replacing a planned cameo appearance by Daniel Craig as Balder the Brave. Stewart uses a yellow wheelchair akin to the one seen in X-Men: The Animated Series (1992–1997) and utters a line from X-Men: Days of Future Past (2014). His involvement in the film was first confirmed in the film's second trailer, though it was unclear whether he would be playing Xavier. Waldron, who wrote this film's script, was unable to include Namor as part of the Illuminati because Marvel Studios had other plans for him; the character would later appear in the film Black Panther: Wakanda Forever (2022). Obadiah Stane / Iron Monger was considered to appear as a member of the Illuminati.

Also appearing in the film is a version of Strange who has been corrupted by the Darkhold and has a third eye. The main MCU reality is designated Earth-616 by an alternate version of Christine Palmer from Earth-838, a scientist working for the Baxter Foundation. According to actress Rachel McAdams, Palmer's role as a "multiversal expert" allowed her to have more action sequences than in the first film, and her interactions with Earth-616's Strange helped resolve the love story between him and Earth-616's Palmer. Early versions of the film had featured another alternate version of Palmer as well as Earth-838 versions of Nicodemus West and Hope van Dyne / Wasp, but these were cut. Tom Hiddleston was reported to return as Loki, but was absent from the final film. The film introduces several multiverse-related concepts to the MCU. Early on in the film, dreams are revealed to be visions of one's alternate counterparts in the multiverse. Maximoff and Strange later engage in "dreamwalking", a "mentally [and] physically exhausting spell" in which one possesses one's multiversal counterpart using the Darkhold. Additionally, "incursions" are established as universe-ending events which occur when one leaves a large footprint in an alternate reality, causing the connection between both universes to destabilize and resulting in the destruction of one or both of the universes.

The film's focus on the multiverse was revealed at the 2019 San Diego Comic-Con (SDCC), with the announcement of the film's title and release date. Explaining the subtitle Multiverse of Madness, co-producer Richie Palmer stated that the film would explore the definitions of the word "madness" as well as inner demons, while Feige stated his intention to explore the "mind-bending frightening side" of the multiverse. The cast found it difficult to keep track of the different realities of the multiverse. Waldron also sought to avoid excessive fan service, and had to "move fast" regarding the multiverse due to Multiverse of Madness being a film and not a television series. Feeling that his work on the series Rick and Morty (2013–present) had prepared him with introducing concepts like the multiverse, he added that Multiverse of Madness depiction of the multiverse differed from the aforementioned series in that the alternate realities were not solely played for laughs, instead viewing the multiverse as the emotional centerpiece of the film. Waldron chose to write Wanda Maximoff / Scarlet Witch as the film's antagonist instead of a multiverse-related villain such as Kang because he did not want the film to be "overstuffed", and decided to introduce the Illuminati so the film could "find the madness in the multiverse". As Multiverse of Madness was originally intended to be released before No Way Home, Waldron worked with McKenna and Sommers to adjust the plot of the film accordingly after Multiverse of Madness was delayed. Feige described the multiverse as "the next step in the evolution of the MCU", noting that this film would also have significant repercussions on the MCU.

Ant-Man and the Wasp: Quantumania (2023) 
Kang appears in Quantumania, serving as the film's primary antagonist. In the film, he is revealed to have instigated the multiversal war mentioned in Loki, subjugating and destroying entire timelines. Kang's variants, known collectively as the "Council of Kangs", banish him to the Quantum Realm out of fear, and Kang plots his revenge. In the Quantum Realm, he enlists the help of Janet to rebuild the power core of his spaceship, which allows him to travel the multiverse, but Janet rebels upon learning of his past. Using Pym Particles, Janet enlarges the core, rendering it unusable. Decades later, Kang has established an "empire" in the Quantum Realm, terrorizing its inhabitants. He coerces Lang to retrieve the core and restore it to its original size, but Janet intervenes and a battle ensues. Lang and his allies eventually defeat Kang by destroying the core, which distorts and then engulfs him.

The film's mid-credits scene introduces three variants of Kang: Immortus, Rama-Tut, and Centurion, who convene the Council upon learning of Kang's apparent death and plan their multiversal uprising against Earth-616. In the film's post-credits scene, Loki and Mobius encounter yet another variant of Kang, Victor Timely, in the 1900s. This scene sets up the second season of Loki. Two of Hope's sons from an alternate universe were originally intended to appear, but were cut. According to Jonathan Majors, who portrays Kang, the character is a "Nexus Being" who can affect the stability of the multiverse. Screenwriter Jeff Loveness said that since the concept of time travel had already been explored in Endgame, he sought to place greater emphasis on Kang's connections to the multiverse and "evolve" the MCU's multiversal storytelling. He also described the Quantum Realm as a "connected limbo outside of space and time", likening it to the "basement" of the multiverse. Director Peyton Reed stated that Kang's arrival to the MCU would have major implications for the MCU going forward.

Future 
 The second season of What If...? will continue to chronicle the activities of the Watcher, exploring new alternate realities in the multiverse.
 Timely will return in the second season of Loki.
 The Disney+ series Spider-Man: Freshman Year (2024) will explore a version of Parker's origin story in an alternate timeline in which he is mentored by Osborn instead of Stark. Also appearing in the series include alternate versions of Strange, Matt Murdock / Daredevil, Octavius, Mac Gargan / Scorpion, and May Parker.
 The storyline of "What If... Zombies?!" from the first season of What If...? will be continued in the Disney+ series Marvel Zombies (2024).
 Kang will return in the films Avengers: The Kang Dynasty (2025) and Avengers: Secret Wars (2026). He serves as the overarching villain of The Multiverse Saga.

Notable realities

Earth-616 
Earth-616, also known as the Sacred Timeline, is the main reality depicted in the MCU. With the exception of Loki and What If...?, Earth-616 has been the primary setting of all MCU films, television series, and One-Shots. Despite having been designated as Earth-199999 by Marvel Comics in 2008, Multiverse of Madness establishes the MCU as Earth-616, sharing the name with the primary setting of the comics. Marvel Studios executive Nate Moore previously referred to the main MCU universe as Earth-616 in November 2021, and Feige began using the term internally prior to the release of Multiverse of Madness. In addition to Beck's ruse in Far From Home, a reference to the "616 universe" can be seen on Erik Selvig's chalkboard in The Dark World.

2012 Time Heist 
The Avengers visit New York City in an alternate 2012 during the Battle of New York in Endgame. While Bruce Banner / Smart Hulk implores the Ancient One to relinquish the Time Stone, Rogers intercepts a S.T.R.I.K.E. team and acquires Loki's scepter containing the Mind Stone. Stark and Lang attempt to thieve the Tesseract from Stark's alternate counterpart, but the plan goes awry and Loki escapes with the Tesseract. In Loki, this reality is "reset" by the TVA and the alternate Loki is arrested.

2014 Time Heist 
During the Avengers' Time Heist in Endgame, Natasha Romanoff / Black Widow, Clint Barton / Hawkeye, James Rhodes / War Machine, and Nebula time-travel to an alternate Morag in 2014. Romanoff and Barton depart on the Benatar to Vormir to acquire the Soul Stone, in which Romanoff sacrifices herself. Meanwhile, Rhodes and Nebula successfully acquire the Orb containing the Power Stone, but Nebula is captured by the 2014 Thanos. Later, 2014 Thanos and his warship, the Sanctuary II, are teleported to the Avengers Compound in 2023, leading to a major battle between Thanos' forces and the Avengers, Guardians of the Galaxy, Masters of the Mystic Arts, Wakandans, Asgardians, and Ravagers. An alternate version of Gamora from 2014 betrays Thanos and joins 2023 Nebula, later disappearing from the battlefield. She will return in the film Guardians of the Galaxy Vol. 3 (2023).

Zombie apocalypse 
In a reality first explored in "What If... Zombies?!", Pym rescues Janet from the Quantum Realm as he did in the film Ant-Man and the Wasp (2018), only to discover that Janet has been infected with a quantum virus which transformed her into a zombie. This leads to a zombie apocalypse, with many Avengers turned into zombies, including Stark, Strange, Wong, Barton, Happy Hogan, Sam Wilson / Falcon, Sharon Carter / Agent 13, Rogers, and Maximoff. This reality will be revisited in Marvel Zombies, in which additional characters are revealed to have transformed into zombies, including Emil Blonsky / Abomination, Ava Starr / Ghost, Carol Danvers / Captain Marvel, Okoye, and Ikaris.

Ultron's conquest 
The episode "What If... Ultron Won?" of the first season of What If...? is centered on an alternate reality where Ultron transfers his consciousness into the Vision's body, acquires the Infinity Stones from Thanos, and wipes out all life in the universe. This leads into the first-season finale, "What If... the Watcher Broke His Oath?", in which the Watcher assembles six multiversal characters from the previous episodes to the Guardians of the Multiverse, and Ultron is defeated. The animators utilized an artistic effect called the Kirby Krackle in these two episodes in order to demonstrate the multiversal power of Ultron and the Watcher, which Bradley was adamant on including due to it never have been used before in the MCU.

Peter-Two's reality 
No Way Home features characters from Sam Raimi's Spider-Man film series, with many actors reprising their roles from the trilogy. The version of Parker from this universe, dubbed "Peter-Two", uses organic webbing instead of web shooters like his alternate counterparts, and maintains a complicated relationship with love interest Mary Jane Watson. Three of Parker's villains, which include Osborn, Octavius, and Marko, are transported to Earth-616 as well.

Peter-Three's reality 
No Way Home also features characters from Marc Webb's The Amazing Spider-Man film series, with many actors reprising their roles from the duology. The version of Parker from this universe, dubbed "Peter-Three", reels from the death of girlfriend Gwen Stacy in the film The Amazing Spider-Man 2 (2014), holding himself responsible for his failure to save her. Two of Parker's villains, which include Connors and Dillon, are transported to Earth-616 as well.

Earth-838 
Earth-838 is first introduced in Multiverse of Madness. It is most notably the home to the Illuminati, a secret society founded by an alternate version of Strange. After causing an "incursion" of another reality as a byproduct of using the Darkhold to defeat Thanos, Strange is executed by Boltagon on Titan, and he is succeeded by Mordo as one of the members of the Illuminati. The Illuminati was formed in the wake of the Ultron program's success and the Avengers' subsequent retirement. Other notable inhabitants of Earth-838 include Palmer, Maximoff, her children Billy and Tommy, and various Ultron sentries. The Ultron sentries are voiced by Ross Marquand, reprising his role from What If...? in which he replaced James Spader from the film Avengers: Age of Ultron (2015).

Reception

Critical response 
The Magical Mystery Tour sequence in Doctor Strange was praised by critics, with Umberto Gonzales of TheWrap calling it a "trippy psychedelic thrill ride" and Britt Hayes of ScreenCrush describing it as "astounding, elaborate stuff". On the time travel-centric plot of Endgame, Peter Travers of Rolling Stone found it clichéd but distinctive, while Peter Debruge of Variety called it the "most desperate of narrative cheats". Justin Chang of the Los Angeles Times felt that the use of time travel sacrificed consistency for nostalgia-arousing fan service. Following reports that No Way Home would involve the multiverse, Adam B. Vary of Variety felt that the multiverse could allow Tom Holland, who portrays Parker in the MCU, to appear in the SSU. Graeme McMillian of The Hollywood Reporter speculated whether the Fantastic Four and X-Men would enter the MCU through the multiverse, while Hoai-Tran Bui of /Film questioned whether the addition of multiversal characters would overshadow Holland's performance in No Way Home. Following the film's release, Benjamin Lee of The Guardian applauded Watts for bringing back numerous Spider-Man villains, while John DeFore of The Hollywood Reporter believed that the multiversal plot point addressed the "Iron Man-ification of the character" in prior MCU Spider-Man films. Lee and DeFore also noted the level of fan service present in the film, which was echoed by Bilge Ebiri of Vulture and Don Kaye of Den of Geek.

The depiction of the multiverse in Multiverse of Madness garnered a mixed response from critics. Chang believed that the film's approach to the multiverse allowed the filmmakers to pose intriguing philosophical questions, contrasting this to the multiverse's depiction in the film Everything Everywhere All at Once (2022). TheWrap reviewer Alonso Duralde felt that Multiverse of Madness failed to achieve Everything Everywhere All at Once level of "wit and nerve and character", but commended the America Portal Ride scene as "memorably trippy". Peter Bradshaw of The Guardian was entertained by the America Portal Ride scene, but felt that the concept of the multiverse reduced the overall story's stakes. DeFore, who also reviewed this film, criticized the MCU's multiverse as a "rapidly aging plot device" and a "franchise-sustaining crutch". David Ehrlich of IndieWire voiced frustration over the fact that the film only focused on two parallel universes despite its title, further ridiculing Earth-838's unusual characteristics. Collider Ross Bonaime, and The Atlantic David Sims, and The Mary Sue Princess Weekes all criticized the film's excessive use of fan service. Writing for RogerEbert.com, Brian Tallerico also praised the America Portal Ride sequence, but was disappointed that the film failed to fully tap into the potential of the multiverse. Owen Gleiberman of Variety questioned the logic of the MCU's multiverse.

The introduction of the concept of incursions in Multiverse of Madness led several commentators to believe that Marvel Studios was setting up for an adaptation of Secret Wars (2015), in which incursions play a key role. Evaluating the direction of the MCU, Vary noted the prevalence of the multiverse and the introduction of Kang as a potential "big bad". Feige later revealed that recent MCU projects contained hints as to where the franchise was heading, igniting further speculation.

Theories and speculation 
Evan Peters appears in the ending of the episode "On a Very Special Episode..." of WandaVision as "Pietro Maximoff", after previously portraying Peter Maximoff in Fox's X-Men films. The character was portrayed by Aaron Taylor-Johnson in Age of Ultron, with the character Darcy Lewis noting that Pietro had been "recast" in the fictional WandaVision show-within-a-show sitcom. This appearance was widely discussed by commentators, who declared it an exciting surprise. Many critics believed that this set the stage for the multiverse to be explored in future Phase Four properties. In the series finale, "The Series Finale", Peters' character is revealed to actually be Ralph Bohner, a resident of Westview who is being controlled by Agatha Harkness and impersonating Pietro. This twist was met with a mixed response from critics. Matt Purslow of IGN was disappointed that viewers' speculation did not pay off, calling this an "unfair trick from Marvel", while his colleague Carlos Morales criticized the casting as unnecessary and hollow. On the other hand, Stephen Robinson of The A.V. Club felt that this was an "elegantly simple and self-contained" reveal. Chancellor Agard of Entertainment Weekly and Daniel Gillespie of Screen Rant concurred, with Agard relieved that Peters' character was not the same version from the X-Men films and Gillespie praising the casting as a way to generate discussion. Variety Vary thought this was a "really good joke", but noted how the apparent "multiverse shenanigans" had caused fan speculation to run rampant. Many viewers voiced their frustration online over Peters' character being reduced to a dick joke.

Maguire and Garfield's appearances in No Way Home were kept secret until the film's release, with Holland repeatedly denying that they were in the film. Garfield also dispelled reports of his involvement in the film, while Watts, who returned to direct this film, declined to confirm that Octavius, Dillon, Osborn, Marko, and Connors would return in the film. Feige cautioned fans about rumors, warning that they could be disappointed if they proved to be false. As a result, reports of the aforementioned characters' return generated intense speculation and interest online. Multiverse of Madness had a similar level of speculation as No Way Home prior to its release, with many viewers theorizing that non-MCU Marvel characters would appear in the film. Many of these rumors did not pan out, with the notable exception of Stewart, who initially denied his involvement before admitting it. Waldron expressed interest in the rumor that Tom Cruise would portray an alternate version of Iron Man, but stated that Cruise was never approached due to his filming commitments to Mission: Impossible – Dead Reckoning Part One (2023) and Part Two (2024).  Ryan Reynolds, who portrays Wade Wilson / Deadpool in Fox's X-Men films, rejected claims that he would appear in the film, but Waldron revealed that discussions were held regarding whether to include a cameo appearance by him. Roger Cheng of CNET was disappointed by the Illuminati cameos in Multiverse of Madness due to their limited screentime, opining that the cameos failed to elicit the same feeling of excitement as No Way Home did. Similarly, Kirsten Acuna of Insider dismissed the cameos as "gimmicky fan service" and a missed opportunity. Belen Edwards of Mashable argued the opposite, believing that the Illuminati's quick and brutal death sequences were a "nice change of pace" from No Way Home level of fan service.

Comments from filmmakers 
Waldron acknowledged the danger of using the multiverse as a plot device in the MCU, believing that the stakes of the story could be reduced "if you don't make it personal". Loveness echoed Waldron's comments, adding that he hoped to "evolve" the MCU's multiversal storytelling. He also found it a challenge to make the MCU's multiverse feel unique, given its presence in Rick and Morty, Everything Everywhere All at Once, and Spider-Man: Into the Spider-Verse (2018). Joe Russo, who co-directed Endgame with his brother Anthony, cautioned that an overabundance of multiverse-centric films could lead to adverse results, calling on screenwriters to "push back" against film studios' corporate agendas. Terminator: Dark Fate (2019) director Tim Miller felt that Endgame depiction of time travel was inferior to that of the Terminator franchise because it lowered the story's stakes.

In other media

Sony's Spider-Man Universe 
The mid-credits scene of the SSU film Venom: Let There Be Carnage (2021) sees Brock and Venom being transported to the MCU through the multiverse as a result of Strange's first spell in Spider-Man: No Way Home. Feige stated that this scene was the product of significant collaboration between Marvel Studios and Sony Pictures, and was directed by Watts during the production of that film. After the release of Let There Be Carnage, many commentators expected Hardy to reprise his roles in No Way Home, with the character ultimately appearing in the film's mid-credits scene. Audiences reacted positively to Let There Be Carnage mid-credits scene, though William Hughes of The A.V. Club and Vinnie Mancuso of Collider both noted how the scene overshadowed the rest of the film.

In a similar fashion, the two mid-credits scenes of the SSU film Morbius (2022) see the MCU's  Adrian Toomes / Vulture, portrayed by Michael Keaton and last seen in the film Spider-Man: Homecoming (2017), transported to the SSU as a result of Strange's second spell in No Way Home. He proceeds to ally with Morbius titular character, Michael Morbius, with the intention of forming a team to defeat Spider-Man. Director Daniel Espinosa stated that it was always Sony's intention to have Keaton cameo as Toomes, citing the animated Into the Spider-Verse as the primary inspiration for the scenes. Both scenes received an overwhelmingly negative response from critics, who found them confusing and unsatisfying. Writing for The Mary Sue, Julia Glassman felt that the scenes "[fell] flat" unlike Let There Be Carnage mid-credits scene, while Kate Erbland of IndieWire was puzzled by Keaton's sudden appearance. Time Out Cathy Brennan opined that the scenes were a weak attempt by Sony to "court an audience by dangling a potential connection" to the MCU, while Esquire Brady Langmann and Den of Geek Kaye criticized the scenes' poor writing and lack of logic. Eliana Dockterman of Time described the scene as fulfilling Sony's "corporate mandate" of connecting the SSU to the MCU, pointing out how it contradicted many plot elements of Homecoming and No Way Home.

Disney Parks 
Several MCU-themed attractions at Disney Parks locations are inspired by the MCU, but are said take place in an alternate universe parallel to Earth-616 within the multiverse. These attractions include Avengers Campus at Disney California Adventure and Walt Disney Studios Park, Stark Expo Hong Kong at Hong Kong Disneyland, Guardians of the Galaxy: Cosmic Rewind at EPCOT, and Avengers: Quantum Encounter on the Disney Wish. In this universe, the Blip and its ensuing aftermath did not occur, such as Stark's death, and the Avengers have established campuses across the globe to recruit new heroes. At the D23 Expo in September 2022, a new multiverse-focused attraction at Disney California Adventure was revealed to be in development, featuring numerous MCU heroes from multiple universes on a quest to defeat "King Thanos".

See also 
 Features of the Marvel Cinematic Universe
 Multiverse (DC Comics)

References

Further reading

External links 
 Multiverse at the Marvel Cinematic Universe Wiki

Fictional elements introduced in 2016
Fictional universes
Marvel Cinematic Universe features
Parallel universes in fiction